The discography of Nevermore, a heavy metal band from Seattle, Washington, consists of 7 studio albums, 1 live album, 1 extended play, 1 compilation album, 2 demos, 1 single, 1 video album, and 7 music videos.

Studio albums

Live albums

Compilation albums

Demo albums

Extended plays

Singles

Video albums

Music videos

References

Discographies of American artists
Heavy metal group discographies